The 2011–12 season will be the 109th season in Bradford City A.F.C.'s history, their 97th in the Football League and 99th in the league system of English football. Their 18th-place finish in 2010–11 season means this season will be their fifth successive season in League Two.

In September 2011, the team began a link with American amateur side Palmetto FC Bantams.

Pre-season friendlies

League Two

League table

Matches

FA Cup

League Cup

Football League Trophy

Squad statistics

Statistics accurate as of 5 May 2012

Transfers

Awards

References 

Bradford City A.F.C. seasons
Bradford City